Joan Sastre Vanrell (born 30 April 1997) is a Spanish professional footballer who plays for Greek Super League club PAOK as a right back.

Career

Mallorca
Born in Porreres, Majorca, Balearic Islands, Sastre graduated from local RCD Mallorca's youth system, and made his senior debuts with the reserves in the 2014–15 campaign, in Segunda División B. On 10 September 2015, he made his first team debut, starting in a 2–0 home loss against Huesca, for the season's Copa del Rey.

Ahead of the 2017–18 season, Sastre was definitely promoted to the first team by new manager Vicente Moreno, with the side now in the third level. He scored his first senior goal on 10 December 2017, netting the equalizer in a 1–1 away draw against CF Badalona.

On 30 December 2017, Sastre renewed his contract with the Bermellones until 2020. He subsequently featured regularly as the club achieved two consecutive promotions, and further extended his deal until 2023 on 22 July 2019.

Sastre made his La Liga debut on 17 August 2019, starting in a 2–1 home win over SD Eibar. He shared the starting spot with Fran Gámez during the season, as Mallorca suffered relegation.

Sastre scored his first professional goal on 3 January 2021, netting his team's second in a 2–2 Segunda División away draw against Real Oviedo.

After Mallorca signed Pablo Maffeo from VfB Stuttgart, Joan was no more a first team player so in the winter transfer season they decided to loan him over to PAOK on a six months contract with buy option for the next season.

Loan to PAOK
On 12 January 2022, PAOK FC officially announced the acquisition of Sastre from Mallorca on loan for the remainder of the season, with an option to buy. Sastre scored his first goal against Volos FC on his debut on 22 January 2022.

PAOK
The purchase option from Mallorca with the amount of € 400,000 has been completed and he is a resident of Thessaloniki in the PAOK team.

Career statistics

Club

Honours
PAOK
Greek Cup: Runner-Up: 2021–22

References

External links

1996 births
Living people
Footballers from Mallorca
Spanish footballers
Association football defenders
Spain youth international footballers
La Liga players
Segunda División players
Segunda División B players
Tercera División players
Super League Greece players
RCD Mallorca B players
RCD Mallorca players
PAOK FC players
Spanish expatriate footballers
Spanish expatriate sportspeople in Greece
Expatriate footballers in Greece